Swan Point may refer to -

Places
Swan Point, Alaska archaeological site, United States
Swan Point, Maryland, United States
Swan Point Cemetery located in Providence, Rhode Island, United States
Swan Point, Tasmania, a locality in Australia

Ships
, a British cargo ship in service 1946-49